Daniil Ilyin (born June 17, 1995) is a Russian professional ice hockey player. He is currently an unrestricted free agent who most recently played with Admiral Vladivostok of the Kontinental Hockey League (KHL).

On February 24, 2015, Ilyin made his Kontinental Hockey League debut playing with Torpedo Nizhny Novgorod during the 2014–15 KHL season.

References

External links

1995 births
Living people
Admiral Vladivostok players
Rubin Tyumen players
Russian ice hockey forwards
HC Sochi players
Torpedo Nizhny Novgorod players
Traktor Chelyabinsk players
Universiade medalists in ice hockey
Universiade gold medalists for Russia
Competitors at the 2017 Winter Universiade
HC Yugra players